Osao Chosei Funahara (born December 10, 1953) is a musician and film director and producer. Born in Hyōgo Prefecture of Japan, Chosei Funahara was educated in both United States and Japan. He received his Bachelor of Fine Arts at the Nihon University College of Art's Cinema Department in Tokyo. While pursuing New York University's NYU Graduate School of Arts and Science (Cinema Studies), he performed as bassist and founding member of the cult punk rock group the Plasmatics.

Filmography

Producer 

Cagney Lies (2008)
Still Normal (2007)
Masabumi Kikuchi (post-production)
Dark Voices (2001) (co-producer)
Tokyo Decadence (1992) (producer) ... a.k.a. Sex Dreams of Topaz (Hong Kong) ... a.k.a. Topâzu ( Japanese )
In the Soup (1992) (co-executive producer)
Fatal Mission (1990) (producer) ... a.k.a. DeadLock (Japanese) ... a.k.a. Enemy (Germany)
Raffles Hotel (1989) (associate producer)
Sons (1989) (executive producer)

Other film credits 

Dark Voices (2001) (Director)
Kyoko (2000) (production consultant)
Amerikanskaya doch (1995) (production consultant) ... a.k.a. Американская дочь (Russia) ... a.k.a. American Daughter
Somebody to Love (1994) (special thanks)
Hsi yen (1993) (soundtrack supervisor) ... a.k.a. The Wedding Banquet (USA)

In addition to these feature film credits, Chosei Funahara has produced or directed a total of more than sixty short films, documentaries and numerous TV commercials in Japan, the United States and Europe.

Selected short films 

War (1999)
Widget (1999), directed by Funahara and produced by Hal Hartley
Trouble (1994), directed by Richard Edson
DEADEND (1994), directed by Miron Zownir
Cacophony, Lonesome Hitmen from Montana, for German TV ZDF (1988)
Cockroach Alarm in Spanish Harlem (1987)
New York City Marathon (1986), written by Ryu Murakami
The Houseguest (1986), featuring John Cale and Zoe Lund

Music video 

I am Siam (1984) directed by Funahara, winner of the American Video Award.

Discography

Extended play (EPs)

Singles

References

External links 
http://www.funahara.com

1953 births
Living people
Japanese rock bass guitarists
Japanese film directors
Japanese film producers
Tisch School of the Arts alumni
Plasmatics members
Nihon University alumni